Zizina is a genus of gossamer-winged butterflies (Lycaenidae) in the subfamily Polyommatinae.

Species
Zizina antanossa (Mabille, 1877) – dark grass blue or clover blue
?Zizina emelina
Zizina labradus (Godart, [1824]) – common grass blue, grass blue, or clover blue
Zizina otis (Fabricius, 1787) – lesser grass blue
Zizina oxleyi (C. & R. Felder, [1865])
?Zizina similus

External links

Zizina at funet
 Seitz, A. Die Gross-Schmetterlinge der Erde 13: Die Afrikanischen Tagfalter. Plate XIII 74

Polyommatini
Lycaenidae genera